Papilio andraemon, the Bahaman swallowtail, is a swallowtail butterfly of the subfamily Papilioninae. It is found on the Bahamas, Cuba, Jamaica and the Cayman Islands. It is a rare stray or temporary colonist of the Florida Keys or the mainland near Miami.

Adults are on wing from April to October (December in Jamaica) in three generations per year.

The larvae feed on various species in the family Rutaceae, including Citrus, Ruta and Zanthoxylum species.

Subspecies
Papilio andraemon andraemon (Florida, Cuba, Jamaica, Little Cayman and Cayman Brac (Cayman Islands))
Papilio andraemon bonhotei Sharpe, 1900 (Bahamas)
Papilio andraemon tailori Rothschild & Jordan, 1906 (Grand Cayman, Cayman Islands)

See also
List of butterflies of Jamaica

Further reading
Lewis, H. L., 1974 Butterflies of the World  Page 24, figure 10
F. Martin Brown and Bernard Heineman, Jamaica and its Butterflies (E. W. Classey, London 1972), plate VIII
R. R. Askew and P. A. van B. Stafford, Butterflies of the Cayman Islands (Apollo Books, Stenstrup 2008) , pp. 110–113

External links

Nearctica
Butterflycorner Images from Naturhistorisches Museum Wien

andraemon
Butterflies of the Caribbean
Butterflies of Cuba
Butterflies of Jamaica
Butterflies described in 1823